Frances Andrea Silva León (born November 2, 1992) is a Venezuelan-American retired soccer forward and midfielder who played for FC Kansas City.

Early life

High school
Frances attended Blue Valley North High School in Overland Park, KS.

West Virginia University
In her college years, she played for West Virginia Mountaineers women's soccer team. In her four years with the Mountaineers, Silva helped WVU claim four conference championships. During her senior season, Silva finished with 15 goals, 13 assists and 43 points.
Silva was Second Team NSCAA All-America in 2013 and First Team NSCAA Scholar All-America in 2013.

Playing career

Club

She was drafted by FC Kansas City in the 2014 NWSL College Draft. She was the 19th overall pick. She scored her first goal for FC Kansas City on May 3, 2014, in a 4–0 win against Houston Dash. On June 14, 2014, Silva scored her second-career goal, a game-winner in the third minute of stoppage time, also against the Dash.

Silva had an impressive sophomore campaign with the Blues, appearing in 15 of the squad's 20 matches. She led the entire NWSL in assists per minute played (minimum three assists recorded), averaging an assist every 145.6 minutes of action. Megan Rapinoe's mark of an assist every 164.8 minutes played was good for second in the league. In the end, Silva and the Blues recorded their second straight NWSL Title, defeating the Seattle Reign, 2–1, at Providence Park in Portland, Oregon, on October 1, 2015.

Silva announced her retirement from professional soccer on November 16, 2016, ending her time with FC Kansas City.

International
Silva played for the United States U-23 National Team at the Six Nations Tournament in La Manga, Spain, in the winter of 2014. She started and scored her first international goal in a 2–0 win over Sweden on March 4, 2014. She ultimately helped guide the USA squad to three wins and a Six Nations Tournament title

Honours

Club 
FC Kansas City
Winner
 NWSL championship: 2014
 NWSL championship: 2015

Personal life
She was born in Venezuela and is fluent in both English and Spanish. She studied in West Virginia University, television journalism with a minor in sports communication. Silva received her master's degree in sport management from West Virginia University in the summer of 2014.

References

External links
 FC Kansas City player profile
 West Virginia player profile
 

1992 births
Living people
FC Kansas City players
National Women's Soccer League players
Soccer players from Kansas
Women's association football forwards
American women's soccer players
Women's association football midfielders
West Virginia Mountaineers women's soccer players
Venezuelan women's footballers
Venezuelan emigrants to the United States
American sportspeople of Venezuelan descent
FC Kansas City draft picks
Footballers from Caracas